James Norton (Newark-on-Trent, 9 June 1789 – 29 August 1835) was a British navy officer who participated as a combatant and commander of the Imperial Brazilian Navy during the Cisplatine War.

He joined the Royal Navy in 1802, taking part in the Napoleonic Wars under the command of Admiral Edward Pellew. With the independence of Brazil, the emperor Pedro I began the formation of a navy, hiring the services of Lord Thomas Cochrane, having sent Felisberto Caldeira Brant to Great Britain to recruit officers, among them James Norton.

In the Pernambuco campaign, in 1824, at the head of a corps of sailors, he seized Recife. In the Cisplatine War, he was sent to the Río de la Plata with the frigate Niterói under his command. Soon after he assumed and commanded the naval division blockading Buenos Aires, achieving several victories and dinstinguishing himself in many battles, particularly those of 30 July 1826, April 8 and December 7, 1827 and of June 16, 1828. In the latter, he lost his right arm and, on February 17 of the same year, he was slightly wounded.

He successfully led the blockade of the Río de la Plata, which brought Argentine public finances to the brink of collapse, hastening the peace agreement that ended the war, despite Brazilian defeats on land. Norton then destroyed the best ships of the Argentine fleet: the frigate 25 de Mayo, the brigs Independencia, Republica, Congreso and General Brandzen. After the war, he was knighted in the Imperial Order of the Cross, and also received the Imperial Order of the Rose. On 17 October 1829, he was promoted to head of division, with the rank of Rear Admiral.

He died on 29 August 1835 on board of a ship off the west coast of New Zealand travelling back to Brazil.

His widow, Eliza Bland, published in 1837 a small work, entitled A noiva do Brasil (The Brazilian Bride). The couple's enthusiasm for the new country, according to British historian Brian Vale, is revealed by some of the names given to their children: Fletcher Carioca, Fredrick da Prata and Maria Brasília.

References

Bibliography

External links 
 The Brazilian Bride.
 Biography of James Norton, by the Baron of Rio Branco.

People of the Cisplatine War
1789 births
1835 deaths
Royal Navy officers
People from Newark-on-Trent
Royal Navy personnel of the Napoleonic Wars
19th-century Brazilian military personnel
English amputees
Brazilian admirals
English emigrants to Brazil
People who died at sea